SB-705498 is a drug which acts as a potent and selective blocker of the TRPV1 ion channel. It has been evaluated in clinical trials for the treatment of rhinitis and chronic cough.

See also 
 AMG-517
 AMG-9810
 Discovery and development of TRPV1 antagonists

References 

Ureas
Trifluoromethyl compounds
Pyridines
Bromoarenes
Pyrrolidines